Mathieu Bonello (born 22 September 1982) is a French rugby union player. His position is hooker and he currently plays for Castres Olympique in the Top 14. He began his career with UA Gaillac, before moving to Castres Olympique in 2007.

Honours

Club 
 Castres
Top 14: 2012–13

References

1982 births
Living people
French rugby union players
Sportspeople from Albi
Castres Olympique players
Rugby union hookers